Howmeh Rural District is in the Central District of Borujen County, Chaharmahal and Bakhtiari province, Iran. At the census of 2006, its population was 10,230 in 2,505 households; there were 1,228 inhabitants in 345 households at the following census of 2011; and in the most recent census of 2016, the population of the rural district was 1,133 in 329 households. The largest of its three villages was Dehnow, with 978 people.

References 

Borujen County

Rural Districts of Chaharmahal and Bakhtiari Province

Populated places in Chaharmahal and Bakhtiari Province

Populated places in Borujen County